Trump Force One is a nickname, coined to sound analogous to Air Force One, for The Trump Organization's Boeing 757 used by Donald Trump prior to and after his presidency. The name was in use during his presidential campaign of 2016.

Trump's 757
The Boeing 757-200 is registered in the United States as N757AF and was built in 1991. It was originally delivered to Denmark's Sterling Airlines and by 1993 was operated by Mexico's TAESA. In 1995, it became a corporate jet for Paul Allen's enterprises. Trump's DJT Operations I LLC bought the plane in 2011.

The aircraft has two Rolls-Royce RB211 turbofan engines, and is configured to seat 43 people. It has a dining room, bathroom, shower, bedroom, guest room, and galley. Many fixtures are plated in 24k gold.

Donald Trump had planned to use the 757 for campaigning during his putative 2012 presidential bid. Trump used the 757 for transportation during his successful 2016 presidential campaign. After becoming President, Trump began to travel on the Boeing VC-25s commonly referred to as Air Force One.

The Boeing 757 was used by The Trump Organization for executive trips until mid-2019 when it was put into storage on a fenced-off tarmac at Stewart International Airport. The left Rolls-Royce RB211 engine has been removed, and a one cycle (1 takeoff/landing) replacement/loaner engine has not been found since it has been placed in storage. Once an engine was sourced, the aircraft was scheduled to be flown to a maintenance, repair and overhaul facility (MRO) in Lake Charles, Louisiana, for overdue maintenance.

As of March 20, 2021, the plane was still awaiting service at Stewart International Airport. Flight records showed that the plane had not been flown since the end of Trump's presidency. On May 21, 2021, Trump announced in a press release that the plane would be restored and upgraded at a service facility in Louisiana.

On November 1, 2021, the plane was flown to Chennault International Airport near Lake Charles, Louisiana, with a one-hour stopover in Nashville, Tennessee, after declaring an emergency.

On October 22, 2022, the plane would take its first flight back after major upgrades. It was flown right back to Trump in West Palm Beach, Florida. 

The plane was spotted at Trump rallies in Robstown, Texas, on October 22, 2022, and Dayton, Ohio, on November 7, 2022, where he had the plane taxi to the stage.

On January 3, 2023 the aircraft was returned to the maintenance facility in Louisiana after only six flights.

On 21 January 2023, the aircraft flew to Fayetteville, North Carolina, for Ineitha (Diamond) Hardaway's Celebration of Life. Trump was aboard.

Trump's Cessna
 
When Trump visited Trump Tower in Manhattan in March 2021 he used the Trump Organization's 1997 Cessna 750 Citation X. The plane seats eight passengers and has a cabin height of 5 feet 7 inches (170 centimeters). When it was first purchased it was the fastest business jet in the world. It is the only operational airplane in the Trump Organization's fleet, which also has three helicopters.  The FAA reportedly cited the plane in 2016 when the Trump organization did not renew its registration. The Citation X became the main jet of Donald Trump after his presidency.

See also
 VIP transport

References

Further reading

 
 

The Trump Organization
Donald Trump